Greatest Hits, Vol. 1 is a collection of ten previously released singles by Ray Stevens, released in 1987. Of the selections of songs, three were recorded for the record label of Monument Records ("Gitarzan," "Along Came Jones," and "Ahab the Arab,"), four for Barnaby Records ("Everything Is Beautiful," "Turn Your Radio On," "The Streak," "Misty"), one for RCA Records ("Shriner's Convention"), and two for MCA Records. The version of "Gitarzan" is the album version that begins with cheering and applauding of an audience. The version of "Ahab the Arab" on this compilation is not the original recording but a re-recording that Stevens made for his album Gitarzan during his career with Monument.

On the back of the album cover, there is a brief essay on Stevens' life and career that covered his beginnings to the time of this collection's release, written by Ronnie Pugh of the Country Music Foundation.

The second volume of this collection was released by MCA eight months later.

Track listing

Album credits
Compiled from liner notes.
All selections except "Gitarzan" and "Along Came Jones" were produced and arranged by: Ray Stevens
"Gitarzan" and "Along Came Jones" were produced by Ray Stevens, Fred Foster and Jim Malloy
"The Streak," "Turn Your Radio On," "Misty," "Gitarzan," "Ahab the Arab," "Along Came Jones," and "Everything Is Beautiful" are through the courtesy of Barnaby Records
"Shriner's Convention" is through the courtesy of RCA Records
"It's Me Again Margaret" and "The Mississippi Squirrel Revival" are through the courtesy of MCA Records
Mastered by Glenn Meadows at Masterfonics using the JVC Digital Audio Mastering System
Art Direction: Ray Stevens and Slick Lawson
Photography: Slick Lawson
Album Graphics: Barnes and Company
Design: Deb Mahalanobis

Chart performance

References

1987 compilation albums
Ray Stevens compilation albums
MCA Records compilation albums